Southwestern National Bank is a United States based community bank with headquarters in Chinatown and in Greater Sharpstown in Houston, Texas that focuses on Asian American clients. Other Texas branches include Plano, Richardson, Austin and Sugar Land. This privately held community bank was founded on November 3, 1997.

The location of Southwestern National Bank in the south reflects one of the newest trends of Chinese American and Asian American population diffusion into areas other than the traditional regions settled by Asian Americans, such as the western United States and northeastern United States.  The establishment of this bank was in accompaniment with the booming economy of the late 1990s of Chinatown, Houston and also the Telecom Corridor (Silicon Prairie) in suburban Dallas, Texas.  These two trends attracted a significant number of Chinese / Asian scientists, engineers, immigrants, businessman, and real estate investors into the area.

In addition to the traditional Chinese clients, a significant number of the ethnic minority clients of Southwestern National Bank are Hoa (Chinese Vietnamese), Indian, and Vietnamese.

References

Other sources 
Bank bets on growth in Asian communities
Moreno, Jenalia. "Houston Banks cater to Asian Businesses." (Archive) Houston Chronicle.
Houston-based banks feel less subprime pain

External links

Southwestern National Bank homepage

Banks based in Texas
Banks established in 1997
Chinese American banks
Chinese-American culture in Texas
Companies based in Houston
Companies based in Texas
Financial services companies of the United States